Gemini 12 (officially Gemini XII) was a 1966 crewed spaceflight in NASA's Project Gemini. Commanded by Gemini VII veteran James A. Lovell, the flight featured three periods of extravehicular activity (EVA) by rookie Edwin "Buzz" Aldrin, lasting a total of 5 hours and 30 minutes. It also achieved the fifth rendezvous and fourth docking with an Agena target vehicle.

Gemini XII marked a successful conclusion of the Gemini program, achieving the last of its goals by successfully demonstrating that astronauts can effectively work outside of spacecraft. This was instrumental in paving the way for the Apollo program to achieve its goal of landing a man on the Moon by the end of the 1960s.

Crew

Backup crew

Support crew
 Stuart A. Roosa (Cape CAPCOM)
 Charles "Pete" Conrad Jr. (Houston CAPCOM)
 William A. Anders (Houston CAPCOM)

Mission parameters

Mass: 
Perigee: 
Apogee: 
Inclination: 28.87°
Period: 88.87 min

Docking
Docked: November 12, 1966 - 01:06:00 UTC
Undocked: November 13, 1966 - 20:18:00 UTC

Space walk
 Aldrin - EVA 1 - (stand up)
Start: November 12, 1966, 16:15:00 UTC
End: November 12, 1966, 18:44:00 UTC
Duration: 2 hours, 29 minutes
 Aldrin - EVA 2
Start: November 13, 1966, 15:34:00 UTC
End: November 13, 1966, 17:40:00 UTC
Duration: 2 hours, 06 minutes
 Aldrin - EVA 3 (stand up)
Start: November 14, 1966, 14:52:00 UTC
End: November 14, 1966, 15:47:00 UTC
Duration: 0 hours, 55 minutes

Launch

Liftoff of the Atlas/Agena Target Vehicle occurred at 2:07:59 PM EST, and of the Gemini/Titan spacecraft at 3:46:33 PM EST, on November 11. All launch vehicle systems performed nominally during powered flight, but at staging there was a recurrence of the first stage oxidizer tank rupture first seen on Gemini 10's launch. On Gemini 12, the fuel tank appeared to have also ruptured as a white cloud was seen emitting from the spent stage along with the orange nitrogen tetroxide. Another episode of "Green Man" also occurred at SECO, referring to pitch gyrations caused by pressure buildup in the second stage protective skirt.

Objectives

At the completion of the previous Gemini flight, the program still had not demonstrated that an astronaut could work easily and efficiently outside the spacecraft. Prior to the Gemini XII mission, other astronauts from previous missions of the Gemini Program had attempted EVAs. However, their successes were limited due to a lack of proper restraints and insufficient techniques. In preparation for Gemini XII new, improved restraints were added to the outside of the capsule, and a new technique—underwater training—was introduced, which would become a staple of future space-walk simulation. The main purpose of the Gemini XII mission was to find and test new ways to work outside of a spacecraft safely and effectively. Aldrin's two-hour, 20-minute tethered space-walk, during which he photographed star fields, retrieved a micrometeorite collector and did other chores, at last demonstrated the feasibility of extravehicular activity. Two more stand-up EVAs also went smoothly, as did the by-now routine rendezvous and docking with an Agena which was done "manually" using the onboard computer and charts when a rendezvous radar failed. The climb to a higher orbit, however, was canceled because of a problem with the Agena booster.

During orbital injection, the GATV engine experienced a drop in turbopump speed lasting about 2.5 seconds. After this, pump performance returned to normal. Telemetry data indicated erratic pump speeds, but engine performance did not reflect this. The anomaly was later found as a brief 30 psi drop in the thrust chamber of the rocket. The mission had planned for an orbital maneuver into a higher orbit but the drop in pressure raised some concerns. Ground controllers decided not to risk the planned orbital boost maneuver since the exact reason for the pump slowdown was unclear. Following Gemini 12's reentry and during the GATV's 63rd orbit, they attempted to fire the propulsion system, but a stuck fuel valve prevented engine start from occurring.

It was suspected that a turbopump bearing failure caused the anomalous conditions during orbital injection, followed by heating and melting of pump components. The inability of ground controllers to start the engine during the 63rd orbit was possibly due to melted or loose debris blocking the fuel valve and preventing its operation. The telemetry data falsely reporting erratic pump speed was concluded to be debris being knocked around and affecting the data probes.

The 1994 book and documentary Moon Shot, as well as the 2008 documentary When We Left Earth: The NASA Missions, credits the spacewalk innovations, including the underwater training, to Aldrin himself. However, the 2016 article "Inventing Underwater Training for Walking in Space," by Michael Neufeld reveals that neutral buoyancy experimentation began at aerospace companies and at NASA Langley Research Center in Hampton, Virginia a few years before the first Gemini mission had even flown. 

Gemini 12 was designed to perform rendezvous and docking with the Agena target vehicle, to conduct three extra-vehicular activity (EVA) operations, to conduct a tethered stationkeeping exercise, to perform docked maneuvers using the Agena propulsion system to change orbit, and demonstrate an automatic reentry.

When Gemini 12 was being planned, one of the possibilities raised was the potential for the flight to be run in conjunction with the first Apollo mission, which had been tentatively scheduled for the last quarter of 1966. By May 1966, delays in making Apollo ready for flight just by itself, and the extra time needed to incorporate compatibility with the Gemini, made that impractical. This became moot when slippage in readiness of the Apollo spacecraft caused the last-quarter 1966 target date to be missed, and the Apollo mission was rescheduled for February 21, 1967.

Experiments

The 14 scientific experiments were (1) frog egg growth under zero-g, (2) synoptic terrain photography, (3) synoptic weather photography, (4) nuclear emulsions, (5) airglow horizon photography, (6) UV astronomical photography, and (7) dim sky photography. Two micrometeorite collection experiments, as well as three space phenomena photography experiments, were not fully completed.

Reentry
The capsule was controlled on reentry by computer and splashed down 4.8 kilometers from its target. The crew were taken aboard the aircraft carrier .

The Gemini 12 mission was supported by the following U.S. Department of Defense resources; 9,775 personnel, 65 aircraft and 12 ships.

Postflight medical examination disclosed no unusual conditions in either astronaut. Both were slightly exhausted and dehydrated due to problems with the spacecraft's water supply system forcing them to reduce their fluid intake on the last day of the mission and Lovell had a mild case of pinkeye.

Insignia

The patch's unique orange and black colors are a link to the flight's original scheduled date close to Halloween. The Roman numeral XII is located at the 12 o'clock position on the face of a clock, with the Gemini spacecraft pointing to it like the hour hand of a clock. This represents the position of Gemini 12 as the last flight of the Gemini program. With the Apollo project following this last flight of the Gemini program, the ultimate objective—the Moon—is symbolized by the crescent on the left.

Spacecraft location

After several years at the Museum of Transport and Technology, in Auckland, New Zealand, the spacecraft was returned to the United States. It is now on display at the Adler Planetarium, Chicago, Illinois. Lovell and Aldrin were reunited with the spacecraft November 9, 2006 during the opening for Adler's "Shoot for the Moon" exhibit, almost 40 years after the mission launched.

See also 

 Agena Target Vehicle
 Extra-vehicular activity
 List of spacewalks
 Splashdown
 Solar eclipse of November 12, 1966
 Space suit

References

External links

NASA Gemini 12 press kit - Nov 3, 1966
Gemini 12 Mission Report (PDF) January 1967

NASA Space Science Data Coordinated Archive
U.S. Space Objects Registry https://web.archive.org/web/20090521121750/http://usspaceobjectsregistry.state.gov/search/index.cfm

Buzz Aldrin
Extravehicular activity
Human spaceflights
Project Gemini missions
Spacecraft launched in 1966
Spacecraft launched by Titan rockets
November 1966 events
Jim Lovell